CRD or crd may refer to:

Documents
 EU Capital Requirements Directive,  for financial services
 Central Registration Depository, of US securities industry

Organizations
 Capital Regional District, in British Columbia, Canada
 Central Research Department of E. I. du Pont de Nemours
 Centre for Reviews and Dissemination, health research institute, York University
 Conservative Research Department of UK Conservative Party
 Air Corridor, Mozambique airline, ICAO airline designator
 CRD Records

Science and technology
Chord (geometry)
.crd, ChordPro filename extension
Chrome Remote Desktop
Common Rail Diesel
Completely randomized design

Other uses
 General Enrique Mosconi International Airport,  Comodoro Rivadavia, Argentina, IATA code
 Concussion reduction device, for a firearm
 ISO 639-3 code for the Coeur d'Alene/snchitsu’umshtsn language.
 CRD (film)